The women's snowboard slopestyle competition of the FIS Freestyle Ski and Snowboarding World Championships 2017 was held at Sierra Nevada, Spain on March 9 (qualifying) and March 11 (finals). 
35 athletes from 21 countries competed.

Qualification
The following are the results of the qualification.

Final
The following are the results of the finals.

References

Snowboard slopestyle, women's